The Tipperary–Limerick fixture has been one of the biggest clashes in Munster hurling history. This fixture has provided the closest and most exciting matches, including the three game saga in 2007, which Limerick finally won in the third game in extra-time by 3 points.

Roots

History
The rivalry has lasted, due to both teams success in the Munster and All Ireland Senior Championships. Although far behind Tipp and Cork in accolades and achievements, they are never far behind in the rivalries and have even beaten these two teams well on some occasions. Limerick is the third most successful team in Munster hurling. Clare and Waterford coming late onto the scene, Limerick has already won 18 Senior Munster titles and 7 All Ireland senior titles, although just one since 1940 and in recent history (since 1980) they lag behind counties such as Galway, Clare and Offaly. Limerick had a rich history in the early decades of the GAA, but have flattered to deceive in recent times. They have produced some decent hurlers like Mick and John Mackey, Jackie Power, Paddy Scanlon and Ciarán Carey. These two teams have given us great games, the 1973 Munster final and the 3 game saga of 2007 come to mind straight away. As does the 1996  Munster Final, which resulted in 2 memorable games. The present situation is in favour of Tipp, but from 1972 to 1987, Limerick had a hoodoo over Tipp during their famine, which they met four times, including 1981, in which Tipp led by 10 points, Limerick bringing it back to draw and then Limerick won the replay.

Statistics

All time results

References

See also
Limerick GAA
Tipperary GAA
Munster Senior Hurling Championship
All-Ireland Senior Hurling Championship

Tipperary
Tipperary county hurling team rivalries